The Sofitel Philippine Plaza Manila is a luxury hotel in Pasay, Metro Manila, Philippines under the Sofitel hotel chain of AccorHotels.

History

Construction and opening 
The hotel was originally built as the Philippine Plaza, one of several hotels rushed into construction at the behest of First Lady Imelda Marcos for the 1976 Annual Meetings of the International Monetary Fund and the World Bank in Manila during the administration of her husband, President Ferdinand Marcos. The hotel was designed by Leandro Locsin of Leandro V. Locsin & Partners, who would be named a National Artist of the Philippines for architecture.

Management and renovation history 
The hotel was managed under the Westin brand until the management contract with Starwood hotels ended in 2005. The Westin Hotel Company made renovations on the hotel in 1994 and July 1995. In 2006, the hotel signed a new management contract with AccorHotels.

The following year, after extensive renovation works worth millions of pesos, the hotel was rebranded as Sofitel Philippine Plaza.

Features
In 1994, before the AccorHotels group took over ownership from Westin, the hotel hosted 670 guest rooms. In 2016, it hosted 609 rooms and 46 suites.

The hotel hosts the Grand Plaza Ballroom which can accommodate between 1,000 and 1,400 people. For smaller functions, the ballroom can be divided into three smaller ballrooms that are given names of the country's three major island groupings: Luzon, Visayas, and Mindanao. The ballroom underwent a major renovation in 2014. Some of the ballroom's features designed by Locsin have been kept, most notably the Murano crystal chandeliers, which have been a fixture of all the rooms since the hotel's opening. The hotel management partnered with A. Ilustre and Associates for the renovation, while the architect firm in turn consulted architect Raul R. Locsin who works for the original firm behind the hotel.

References

Hotels in Metro Manila
Buildings and structures in Pasay
Hotel buildings completed in 1976
Leandro Locsin buildings
Sofitel